The San Joaquin Experimental Range is an ecosystem research experimental area in the foothills of the Sierra Nevada. The range includes a portion of California grassland and California woodlands with blue oak, interior live oak, and bull pine.

The San Joaquin Experimental Range was established after a statement on the need for an experimental area in the San Joaquin Valley foothills was prepared in 1934. The initial purpose for the San Joaquin Experimental Range was to learn how to better manage these lands and investigate resource and animal husbandry problems associated with maintaining a commercial cattle herd on a year-round basis on the foothill rangelands. San Joaquin lands were purchased in 1934, with additional purchases in 1936 and 1937. In 1938, another 64 ha were obtained under authority of the Weeks Forestry Act. Of these, 32 ha have been designated as a Research Natural Area. The San Joaquin is managed cooperatively by the Pacific Southwest Research Station of the United States Forest Service and California State University's Agricultural Foundation, primarily for research and education. Facilities include limited conference facilities, office space, barracks, and storage space available for approved research. 

Today, long-term records on livestock gains and herbage yield and utilization are available. Parts of the range have served as a Research Natural Area, protected from fire and ungrazed by domestic livestock since 1934. Remaining portions of the range have been grazed by various classes of livestock during different seasons. Some range units have been modified through the application of fertilizers. Prescribed burning has been used in some units for forage improvement.

A cowherd and facilities at the experimental range also provide opportunities for students to gain practical experience in the commercial cattle industry.

The range was established as a UNESCO Biosphere Reserve under the designation San Joaquin Biosphere Reserve in 1976. Its biosphere reserve status was withdrawn in 2019, at the request of the US Government.

Administration
The range's administration is located at 
San Joaquin Experimental Range
USDA Forest Service
Sierra Nevada Research Center
2081 East Sierra Avenue
Fresno, CA 93710

A research center and lab is located at
San Joaquin Experimental Range
California State University-Fresno
School of Agricultural Sciences and Technology
2385 East Barstow Avenue
Fresno, CA 93740

References

Sierra Nevada (United States)
Ecological experiments
Protected areas of San Joaquin County, California
Former biosphere reserves of the United States